Sadówka  is a village in the administrative district of Gmina Stryków, within Zgierz County, Łódź Voivodeship, in central Poland.

On September 12, 1939, during the German invasion of Poland which started World War II, invading German troops carried out a massacre of a dozen or so local Polish inhabitants (see Nazi crimes against the Polish nation).

Transport
The Polish A1 motorway runs nearby, east of the village.

References

Villages in Zgierz County
Massacres of Poles
Nazi war crimes in Poland